HMS Cheviot was one of thirty-two  destroyers built for the Royal Navy during the Second World War, a member of the eight-ship Ch sub-class. Completed after the war, she was sold for scrap in 1962.

Design and description
The Ch sub-class was a repeat of the preceding Ca sub-class, except that the addition of remote control for the main-gun mounts caused some of the ships' intended weapons to be removed to save weight.

The ships were powered by a pair of geared steam turbines, each driving one propeller shaft using steam provided by two Admiralty three-drum boilers. The ships' complement was 186 officers and ratings.

The main armament of the destroyers consisted of four QF  Mk IV dual-purpose guns, one superfiring pair each fore and aft of the superstructure protected by partial gun shields. Their anti-aircraft suite consisted of one twin-gun stabilised Mk IV "Hazemeyer" mount for  Bofors guns and two four twin mounts for  Oerlikon AA guns. To compensate for the weight of the remote control equipment, one of the two quadruple 21-inch (533 mm) torpedo tube mounts was removed and the depth charge stowage was reduced to only 35. The ships were fitted with a pair of depth charge rails and two throwers for the depth charges.

Construction and career
Cheviot was ordered from Alexander Stephens & Sons and the ship was laid down on 27 April 1943 at its shipyard in Linthouse, launched on 2 May 1944 and was commissioned on 11 December 1945.

In 1946 Cheviot was assigned to the 1st Destroyer Squadron based at Malta. She saw service, along with other Royal Navy ships in preventing illegal immigration into Palestine in 1947. Her pennant number was also subsequently changed to D90 from R90. She returned to the UK in 1950.  She was given an interim modernisation in 1954, which saw her 'X' turret at the rear of the ship replaced by two Squid anti-submarine mortars.

Between December 1956 and October 1959 she saw service in the Far East, as part of the 8th Destroyer Squadron. Cheviot was decommissioned in March 1960. The ship was used as a target for homing torpedo trials. She was subsequently sold to Thos. W. Ward and arrived at their yard in Inverkeithing for scrapping on 22 October 1962.

References

Bibliography
 
 
 
 
 
 
 
 

 

1944 ships
Ships built on the River Clyde
C-class destroyers (1943) of the Royal Navy
World War II destroyers of the United Kingdom
Cold War destroyers of the United Kingdom